The New Jersey General Assembly is the lower house of the New Jersey Legislature.

Since the election of 1967 (1968 Session), the Assembly has consisted of 80 members. Two members are elected from each of New Jersey's 40 legislative districts for a term of two years, each representing districts with average populations of 232,225 (2020 figures), with deviation in each district not exceeding 3.21% above and below that average. To be eligible to run, a potential candidate must be at least 21 years of age, and must have lived in their district for at least one year prior to the election, and have lived in the state of New Jersey for two years. They also must be residents of their districts. Membership in the Assembly is considered a part-time job, and many members have employment in addition to their legislative work. Assembly members serve two-year terms, elected every odd-numbered year in November. Four current members of the Assembly hold other elective office, as they are grandfathered in under a New Jersey law that banned multiple office holding in 2007.

The Assembly is led by the Speaker of the Assembly, who is elected by the membership of the chamber. After the Lieutenant Governor of New Jersey and the President of the New Jersey Senate, the Speaker of the Assembly is third in the line of succession to replace the Governor of New Jersey in the event that the governor is unable to execute the duties of that office. The Speaker decides the schedule for the Assembly, which bills will be considered, appoints committee chairmen, and generally runs the Assembly's agenda. The current Speaker is Craig Coughlin (D-Woodbridge).

Salary and costs
Members of the NJ General Assembly receive an annual base salary of $49,000 with the Senate President and the Assembly Speaker earning slightly more. Members receive $110,000 for staff salaries. In addition, they receive 12,500 postage stamps, stationery and a telephone card. They receive New Jersey State health insurance and other benefits. The total cost to the State of New Jersey for each member of the general assembly is approximately $200,000 annually.

History
See: New Jersey Legislature#Colonial period and New Jersey Legislative Council#Composition

Composition

Committees and committee chairs
Committee chairs for the 2022-2023 Legislative Session are:
Aging & Senior Services - Asw. Angela V. McKnight (D-Hudson)
Agriculture and Food Security - Asm. Roy Freiman (D-Somerset)
Appropriations - Asw. Lisa Swain (D-Bergen)
Budget - Asw. Eliana Pintor Marin (D-Essex)
Commerce and Economic Development - Asw. Britnee Timberlake (D-Essex)
Community Development & Affairs - Asw. Shavonda E. Sumter (D-Paterson)
Consumer Affairs - Asm. Paul D. Moriarty (D-Gloucester)
Education - Asw. Pamela R. Lampitt (D-Burlington)
Environment and Solid Waste - Asm. James J. Kennedy (D-Union)
Financial Institutions and Insurance - Asm. John F. McKeon (D-Essex)
Health and Senior Services - Asm. Herb Conaway, MD (D-Burlington)
Higher Education - Asw. Mila Jasey (D-Essex)
Homeland Security and State Preparedness - Asw. Shanique Speight (D-Essex)
Housing - Asw. Yvonne Lopez (D-Middlesex)
Human Services - Asw. Angelica Jimenez (D-Hudson)
Judiciary - Asm. Raj Mukherji (D-Hudson)
Labor - Asm. Joseph Egan (D-Middlesex)
Law and Public Safety - Asm. William Spearman (D-Camden)
Military and Veterans' Affairs - Asw. Cleopatra Tucker (D-Essex)
Oversight, Reform and Federal Relations - Asm. Joseph Danielsen (D-Somerset)
Regulated Professions - Asm. Thomas Giblin (D-Essex)
Science, Innovation and Technology - Asm. Christopher Tully (D-Bergen)
Special Committee on Infrastructure and Natural Resources - Asm. Robert J. Karabinchak (D-Middlesex)
State and Local Government - Asm. Anthony S. Verrelli (D-Mercer)
Telecommunications and Utilities - Asm. Wayne DeAngelo (D-Mercer)
Tourism, Gaming and the Arts - Asm. Ralph Caputo (D-Essex)
Transportation and Independent Authorities - Asm. Daniel R. Benson (D-Mercer)
Women and Children - Asw. Gabriela Mosquera (D-Gloucester)

List of past Assembly speakers

Note: The first three subsections below end with a constitutional year: 1776, 1844 or 1947. The fourth subsection ends in 1966, the year of the U.S. Supreme Court decision that required legislative apportionment based on the principle of "one person, one vote".
The following is a list of speakers of the Assembly since 1703.

1703–1776

1703-04: Thomas Gardiner, City of Burlington
1704-06: Peter Fretwell, City of Burlington
1707: Samuel Jennings, City of Burlington
1708-09: Thomas Gordon, City of Perth Amboy
1709-14: John Kay, Gloucester
1716: Daniel Coxe, Jr., Gloucester
1716-19: John Kinsey, Middlesex
1721-22: John Johnstone, City of Perth Amboy
1723-24: William Trent, Burlington
1725-29: John Johnstone, City of Perth Amboy
1730-33: John Kinsey, Jr., Middlesex
1733-38: Interregnum: No Assembly called or elected.
1738: John Kinsey, Jr., Middlesex
1738-39: Joseph Bonnel, Essex
1740-44: Andrew Johnston, City of Perth Amboy
1744-45: Samuel Nevill, City of Perth Amboy
1746-48: Robert Lawrence, Monmouth
1748-51: Samuel Nevill, City of Perth Amboy
1751-54: Charles Read, City of Burlington
1754-58: Robert Lawrence, Monmouth
1759-62: Samuel Nevill, City of Perth Amboy
1763-65: Robert Ogden, Essex
1765-70: Cortlandt Skinner City of Perth Amboy
1770-72: Stephen Crane, Essex
1773-75: Cortlandt Skinner City of Perth Amboy

On December 6, 1775, Gov. William Franklin prorogued the New Jersey Legislature until January 3, 1776, but it never met again. On May 30, 1776, Franklin attempted to convene the legislature, but was met instead with an order by the New Jersey Provincial Congress for his arrest. On July 2, 1776, the Provincial Congress approved a new constitution which ordered new elections; on August 13 an entire new legislature was elected.

1776–1844

1776-78: John Hart, Hunterdon
1778-79: Caleb Camp, Essex
1780: Josiah Hornblower, Essex
1781: John Meheim, Hunterdon
1782-83: Ephraim Harris, Cumberland
1784: Daniel Hendrickson, Monmouth
1784-86: Benjamin Van Cleve, Hunterdon
1787: Ephraim Harris, Cumberland
1788: Benjamin Van Cleve, Hunterdon
1789: John Beatty, Middlesex
1790: Jonathan Dayton, Essex
1791: Ebenezer Elmer, Cumberland
1792-94: Silas Condict, Morris
1795: Ebenezer Elmer, Cumberland
1796: James H. Imlay, Monmouth
1797: Silas Condict, Morris
1798-1800: William Coxe Jr., Burlington
1801: Silas Dickerson, Sussex
1802: William Coxe, Burlington
1803: Peter Gordon, Hunterdon
1804-07: James Cox, Monmouth
1808-09: Lewis Condict Morris
1810-11: William Kennedy, Sussex
1812: William Pearson, Burlington
1813: Ephraim Bateman, Cumberland
1814-15: Samuel Pennington, Essex
1816: Charles Clark, Essex
1817: Ebenezer Elmer, Cumberland
1818-22: David Thompson, Jr., Morris
1823: Lucius Q.C. Elmer, Cumberland
1824: David Johnston, Hunterdon
1825-26: George K. Drake, Morris
1827-28: William B. Ewing, Cumberland
1829-31: Alexander Wurts, Hunterdon
1832: John P. Jackson, Essex
1833-35: Daniel B. Ryall, Monmouth
1836: Thomas G. Haight, Monmouth
1837-38: Lewis Condict, Morris
1839: William Stites, Essex
1840-41: John Emley, Burlington
1842: Samuel Halsey, Morris
1843-44: Joseph Taylor, Cumberland

1845–1947
The Constitution of 1844 expanded the General Assembly to 60 members, elected annually and apportioned to the then-nineteen counties by population.

1845: Isaac Van Wagenen, Essex
1846: Lewis Howell, Cumberland
1847-48: John W. C. Evans, Burlington
1849: Edward W. Whelpley, Morris
1850: John T. Nixon, Cumberland
1851: John H. Phillips, Mercer
1852: John Huyler, Bergen
1853-54: John W. Fennimore, Burlington
1855: William Parry, Burlington
1856: Thomas W. Demarest, Bergen
1857: Andrew Dutcher, Mercer
1858: Daniel Holsman, Bergen
1859: Edwin Salter, Ocean
1860: Austin H. Patterson, Monmouth
1861: Frederick Halstead Teese, Essex
1862: Charles Haight, Monmouth
1863: James T. Crowell, Middlesex
1864: Joseph N. Taylor, Passaic
1865: Joseph T. Crowell, Union
1866: John Hill, Morris
1867: G. W. N. Curtis, Camden
1868: Augustus O. Evans, Hudson
1869-70: Leon Abbett, Hudson
1871: Albert P. Condit, Essex
1872: Nathaniel Niles, Morris
1873: Isaac L. Fisher, Middlesex
1874: Garret A. Hobart, Passaic
1875: George O. Vanderbilt, Mercer
1876: John D. Caracallen, Hudson
1877: Rudolph F. Rabe, Hudson
1878: John Egan, Union
1879: Schuyler B. Jackson, Essex
1880: Sherman B. Oviatt, Monmouth
1881: Harrison Van Duyne, Essex
1882: John T. Dunn, Union
1883: Thomas O'Connor, Essex
1884: A. B. Stoney, Monmouth
1885-86: Edward Ambler Armstrong, Camden
1887: William M. Baird, Warren
1888: Samuel D. Dickinson, Hudson
1889: Robert S. Hudspeth, Hudson
1890: William Christian Heppenheimer, Hudson
1891-92: James J. Bergen, Somerset
1893: Thomas Flynn, Passaic
1894: John I. Holt, Passaic (resigned May 26)
1894-95: Joseph Cross, Union
1896: Louis T. DeRousse, Camden
1897: George W. MacPherson, Mercer
1898-99: David O. Watkins, Gloucester
1900: Benjamin Franklin Jones, Essex
1901-1902: William J. Bradley, Camden
1903: John G. Horner, Burlington
1904-1905: John Boyd Avis, Gloucester
1906: Samuel K. Robbins, Burlington
1907: Edgar E. Lethbridge, Essex
1908: Frank B. Jess, Camden
1909: John D. Prince, Passaic
1910: Harry P. Ward, Bergen
1911: Edward Kenny, Hudson
1912: Thomas F. McCran, Passaic
1913: Leon R. Taylor, Monmouth (became Acting Governor October 28)
1914: Azariah M. Beekman, Somerset
1915: Carlton Godfrey, Atlantic
1916: Charles C. Pilgrim, Essex
1917: Edward Schoen, Essex
1918: Charles A. Wolverton, Camden
1919: Arthur N. Pierson, Union
1920: W. Irving Glover, Bergen
1921: George S. Hobart, Essex
1922: T. Harry Rowland, Camden
1923: William W. Evans, Passaic
1924: Harry G. Eaton, Essex
1925: Clifford R. Powell, Burlington
1926: Ralph W. Chandless, Bergen
1927: Anthony J. Siracusa, Atlantic
1928: Thomas L. Hanson, Middlesex
1929: Guy George Gabrielson, Essex
1930: William B. Knight, Camden
1931: Russell S. Wise, Passaic
1932: Joseph Greenberg, Hudson
1933: Charles A. Otto, Jr., Union (resigned November 14)
1933: Herbert J. Pascoe, Union
1933: Joseph Altman, Atlantic
1935: Lester H. Clee, Essex
1936: Marcus W. Newcomb, Burlington
1936: Thomas G. Walker, Hudson (resigned November 30)
1936: Fred W. De Voe, Middlesex
1938-1939: Herbert J. Pascoe, Union
1940-1941: Roscoe P. McClave, Bergen
1942: John E. Boswell, Cape May
1942: Manfield G. Amlicke, Passaic
1943: Dominic A. Cavicchia, Essex
1944: Freas L. Hess, Somerset
1945: Walter H. Jones, Bergen
1946: Leon Leonard, Atlantic

1948–1967

1947: Joseph L. Brescher, Union
1949: Hugh L. Mehorter, Gloucester
1950: Percy A. Miller, Jr., Essex (resigned)
1950: James E. Fraser, Atlantic (died in office)
1951: Merrill H. Thompson, Monmouth
1952: Lawrence A. Cavinato, Bergen
1953: Elvin R. Simmill, Monmouth
1954: G. Clifford Thomas, Union
1955: Paul M. Salsburg, Atlantic
1956: Leo J. Mosch, Essex
1957: Elden Mills, Morris
1958: William F. Hyland, Camden
1959: William Kurtz, Middlesex
1960: Maurice V. Brady, Hudson
1961: Le Roy J. D'Aloia, Essex
1962: John W. Davis, Salem
1963: Elmer Matthews, Essex
1964: Alfred N. Beadleston, Monmouth
1965: Marion West Higgins, Bergen
1966: Maurice V. Brady (resigned)
1966: Frederick H. Hauser, Hudson
1968: Robert J. Halpin, Cumberland

1968–present

1969: Albert S. Smith, District 2
1970: Peter Moraites, District 13D
1970: William K. Dickey, District 3C
1971: Barry T. Parker, District 4B
1972–1974: Thomas Kean, District 11E
1974–1976: S. Howard Woodson, 13th District (resigned)
1977: Joseph A. LeFante, 31st District
1978: William J. Hamilton, 17th District
1978–1982: Christopher Jackman, 33rd District
1982–1985: Alan Karcher, 19th District
1986–1990: Chuck Hardwick, 21st District
1990–1992: Joseph Doria, 31st District
1992–1996: Chuck Haytaian, 23rd District
1996–2002: Jack Collins, 3rd District
2002–2006: Albio Sires, 33rd District
2006–2010: Joseph J. Roberts, 5th District
2010–2014: Sheila Y. Oliver, 34th District
2014–2018: Vincent Prieto, 32nd District
2018–present: Craig Coughlin, 19th District

Past composition of the Assembly

See also
:Category:Members of the New Jersey General Assembly
New Jersey State Constitution

References

External links
New Jersey Legislature official website
Assembly Democrats official website
Assembly Republicans official website
New Jersey section of Project Vote Smart a national database of voting records and other information about legislators.

New Jersey Legislature
State lower houses in the United States